General Kotikalapudi Venkata Krishna Rao,  (16 July 192330 January 2016) was a former chief of the Indian Army and a former governor of Jammu and Kashmir, Nagaland, Manipur and Tripura.

Gen. Rao was commissioned into the Indian Army in 1942. During the 1971 war,  his division, the 8 Mountain Division, captured the Sylhet area and liberated north-east Bangladesh. He was the Chief of the Army Staff in 1983 and was appointed Governor of Nagaland, Manipur and Tripura in June 1984. He was Governor of Jammu and Kashmir for the first time from 11 July 1989 to 19 January 1990 and the second time from 13 March 1993 till 2 May 1998.

Early life
Gen K. V. Krishna Rao was born on 16 July 1923 in a Telugu Brahmin family based in Vijayawada, the son of Sri K.S.Narayan Rao and his wife, Smt.K.Lakshmi Amma. He graduated from the Maharajah's College, Vizianagaram.

Military career

World War II
He received an emergency commission as a second lieutenant in the 2nd battalion of the Mahar Regiment on 9 August 1942. As a young officer, he served in Burma, North West Frontier and Baluchistan during the Second World War. During the extensive Punjab disturbances in 1947, he served both in East and West Punjab.

Post-Independence
He participated in the first war against Pakistan in Jammu and Kashmir in 1947–48. He was a founder instructor of the National Defence Academy during 1949–51. In May 1951, he was selected to attend the Defence Services Staff College (DSSC), Wellington. After graduating from DSSC, he was appointed general staff officer grade 2 (GSO2) in the army headquarters, where he served till 1955.  Selected for the command of a battalion, he commanded the 3rd Battalion The Mahar Regiment in Jammu and Kashmir during 1956–59.  Thereafter, he served as a general staff officer grade-1 (GSO1) of a division in the Jammu Region during 1960–63. He was a member of the faculty of the Defence Services Staff College during 1963–65. On 15 March 1965, by then a lieutenant-colonel, he was promoted to acting brigadier and given command of the 114 Infantry Brigade in the forward area of Ladakh during 1965–66, when he dealt with both Chinese and Pakistani threats.  He was selected to attend the Imperial Defence College (now Royal college of Defence Studies (RCDS)), London in 1967–68.  He visited Europe, US, Canada and USSR on training assignments.  On return to India, he was promoted substantive brigadier on 5 January 1968 and was appointed deputy director military operations at army headquarters on 13 February, serving through 1968–69.

On 29 June 1969, he was promoted to the acting rank of major general and commanded the 26 Infantry Division in the Jammu Region during 1969–70, with promotion to substantive major-general on 4 August 1970.  Thereafter, he commanded the 8 Mountain Division engaged in counterinsurgency operations in Nagaland and Manipur during 1970–72.  During this period, his division also participated in the Indo-Pakistani War of 1971.  His division captured the Sylhet Area and liberated North East Bangladesh.

He was awarded the Param Vishist Seva Medal (the award for distinguished services of the most exceptional order) for displaying outstanding leadership, courage, determination and drive during this War.  Gen Rao then moved to Western Sector upon his appointment on 1 June 1972 as chief of staff, Western Command. He served in this role from 1972 to 1974, during which period disengagement with Pakistani troops was carried out and fresh plans were made against likely adventures by Pakistan.

On 2 August 1974, Krishna Rao was promoted to the rank of lieutenant general and took over command of the largest corps (XVI Corps) in the Jammu Region.  In addition, during 1975–76, he was also the chairman of the expert committee constituted by the government on re-organisation and modernisation for future defence of the country.  Later, he served as deputy chief of army staff at army headquarters during 1978–79.

Subsequently, he was promoted army commander and served as general officer commanding-in-chief Western Command, then based in Shimla during 1979–81.

Chief of army staff
General Krishna Rao was appointed as chief of army staff on 1 June 1981, and served in that capacity till July 1983.  He was also chairman of the chiefs of staff committee, the highest appointment in the services, during March 1982 – July 1983.  His services and leadership were warmly appreciated by the prime minister and the government.

During his service, General Krishna Rao also held numerous other responsibilities.  He was colonel of the Mahar Regiment during 1968–83.  As chief of army staff, he was also colonel of 61 Cavalry, honorary colonel of the Mechanised Infantry Regiment and the Brigade of the Guards and colonel-in-chief of the National Cadet Corps.  After relinquishing colonelcy of the Mahar Regiment, he was appointed as honorary colonel of the regiment.  He was made honorary general of the Royal Nepalese Army (Now Nepalese Army).  He was principal honorary army ADC to the president.  He was president of Equestrian Federation of India and deputy chairman of the special organising committee of the 1982 Asian Games.  He was patron of the Indian Ex-Services League, United Service Institution of India and National Adventure Foundation.

Gen Krishna Rao retired from service on 31 July 1983.

Progenitor of the "Cold Start" military doctrine

Gen Krishna Rao is credited with coming up with a unique military doctrine, now recognized and termed as 'Cold Start', during India's clashes with Pakistan, when the delay in political decision making resulted in constraining the mobilization of India's military actions. At the core of this doctrine is the initiation of swift, immediate, multiple strikes to counter and contain the enemy nation's aggression, in the interest of safety of the nation, without losing time and strategic advantage due to possible delays in political decisions owing to various domestic and international factors.

Gubernatorial assignments 
From June 1984 to July 1989, General Krishna Rao was the governor of the North Eastern States of Nagaland, Manipur and Tripura.  He was also the governor of Mizoram in June 1988 and March to July 1989.  He was chancellor of the Manipur and Tripura Universities.  He was chairman of the North East Zone Culture Centre.  In his capacity of governor of the North Eastern States, he ensured that peace was brought about and maintained, and that the Tripura Agreement was concluded.

General Krishna Rao was the governor of Jammu and Kashmir during 1989–90. As the governor, He was chancellor of the University of Kashmir, University of Jammu and the Sher-e-Kashmir University of Agricultural Sciences and Technology of Kashmir.  He was also chairman of Shri Mata Vaishno Devi Shrine Board.  When a proxy war developed in Jammu and Kashmir and reached its peak, he was reappointed as governor and served there from 12 March 1993 to 1 May 1998.  In this capacity, he was instrumental in restoring peace and democracy in the insurgency-riven state after a long gap of seven years.

Personal life
He was married to K. Radha Rao and has one son, Narayan and one daughter, Lalitha. His son, K V Narayan Rao, was CEO of the media house NDTV; he died in November 2017 after battling cancer, and within 2 years after his father's death in early 2016.

General Krishna Rao was conferred the honorary doctorate of D.Litt. (honoris causa) by the Andhra University, Doctor of Laws (honoris causa) by Sri Venkateswara University and Doctor of Letters (D. Litt.) (honoris causa) by the Telugu University.

He was a Life Member of the India International Centre, New Delhi, National Sports Club of India, New Delhi, Defence Services Officers Institute, New Delhi, Bharatiya Vidya Bhavan, Mumbai, Divine Life Society and Secunderabad Club.  He played cricket and golf.  His hobbies included photography, gardening and social welfare.

General Krishna Rao died on Martyr's Day, 30 January 2016 in New Delhi.

Books published
1991 – Prepare or Perish – A Study of National Security – (Lancer Publishers, New Delhi)	 
2001 – In the Service of the Nation – Reminiscences –  (Penguin Books Ltd.)
2011 – Invincibility, challenges and Leadership – (Orient Black Swan Ltd.)

Honours and awards

Dates of rank

Notes

References

1923 births
2016 deaths
Chiefs of Army Staff (India)
Generals of the Indo-Pakistani War of 1971
Governors of Jammu and Kashmir
Governors of Manipur
Governors of Mizoram
Governors of Nagaland
Governors of Tripura
University of Jammu
Telugu people
People from Andhra Pradesh
Indian generals
Recipients of the Param Vishisht Seva Medal
Defence Services Staff College alumni
Academic staff of the Defence Services Staff College